The 2005 Speedway Conference League was the third tier/division of British speedway.

Summary
The title was won by Oxford Silver Machine Academy, junior club of the Oxford Cheetahs.

Final league table

Conference League Knockout Cup
The 2005 Conference League Knockout Cup was the eighth edition of the Knockout Cup for tier three teams. Weymouth Wildcats were the winners.

Semi-finals

Final

Other Honours
Conference Trophy - Armadale 99 Stoke 84
Conference league pairs - 1st Wimbledon; 2nd Oxford
Conference league fours - Weymouth 16, Oxford 15, Armadale 9, Boston 8
Conference League Riders' Championship - Steve Boxall (Rye House)

See also
List of United Kingdom Speedway League Champions

References

Conference
Speedway Conference League